Phoebus Delivorias, born 29 September 1973, is a Greek rock musician, singer, and songwriter from Kallithea, Attica.

Career
In 1988, when he was only 15 years old, he took a cassette of his songs to Manos Xatzidakis resulting, one year later, in the release of his debut album "Η παρέλαση" in November 1989. His second disk was released, quite a few years after the first, in July 1995 and it was titled "Η ζωή μόνο ετσι ειν' ωραία". The same year he participated for the first time in a live music performance with Dionysis Savvopoulos. In 1998, his third album was released and it was titled "Χάλια". In the summer of 2003, his next album is released, the title of which is "Ο καθρέφτης".  In 2008, he released his fourth album "Οι απίθανοι περιπέτειες". Two years later, he released his fifth album "Ο Αόρατος Άνθρωπος".

His latest album was released in November 2015, which is "Καλλιθέα".

Concerts
Recent concerts include the Fuzz Club in Athens on 22 December 2010. The Lithografio at Patras on 20 January 2011. Γαία Live on 11 March 2010 in Thessaloniki.

Discography
Foivos Delivorias has released the following albums:

1989: Η Παρέλαση (The Parade)
1995: Η Ζωή Μόνο Έτσι Είν' Ωραία (Life's Only Good This Way)
1998: Χάλια (Mess)
2003: Ο καθρέφτης (The Mirror)
2007: Έξω (Outside)
2010: Ο Αόρατος Άνθρωπος (The Invisible Man)
2015: Καλλιθέα (Kallithea)

Compilations:
2008: Οι Απίθανες Περιπέτειες του Φοίβου Δεληβοριά (The Incredible Adventures of Foivos Delivorias)

References

External links

official website
interview of Phoebus Delivorias

1973 births
Living people
Greek entehno singers
Greek musicians
Greek rock singers
Musicians from Athens